Max Q is a Houston-based rock band whose members are all astronauts.  It was formed in early 1987 by Brewster Shaw and Robert L. Gibson, recruiting George Nelson. Gibson has stated that he came up with the name "Max Q" (though recognizes that Shaw has also claimed having come up with the name himself), the engineering term for the maximum dynamic pressure from the atmosphere experienced by an ascending spacecraft. He joked that like the Space Shuttle, the band "makes lots of noise but no music."

The band's rotating line-up often changes due to flight crew assignments, training, and the occasional retirement. In 2009, members included:
Ricky Arnold – rhythm guitar
Dan Burbank – lead vocals and guitar
Tracy "TC" Caldwell Dyson – lead vocals
Ken "Taco" Cockrell – keyboards and background vocals
Chris Ferguson – drums
Drew Feustel – lead vocals and lead guitar
Kevin A. Ford – drums
Chris A. Hadfield – lead vocals and bass guitar
Greg "Box" Johnson  – keyboards and background vocals
Dottie Metcalf-Lindenburger  – lead vocals
Steve "Stevie Ray" Robinson – lead guitar

Former members include:
Carl Walz – lead vocals
Susan Helms – lead vocals and keyboards (after Hawley left)
Kevin "Chili" Chilton – lead vocals and guitar (after Shaw left)
Pierre Thuot – bass guitar (after Nelson left)
Steven A. Hawley - keyboards (the original keyboard player)

...with the original members having been:
Jim Wetherbee – drums
George "Pinky" Nelson – bass guitar
Robert "Hoot" Gibson – lead vocals and lead guitar
Brewster Shaw – rhythm guitar

The genesis of this band is connected to the Challenger disaster, as it was in the wake of that severely somber event that Dan Brandenstein, as Chief of the Astronaut Office, suggested that they hold a party to lighten things up.  Brewster Shaw then approached Hoot Gibson, who he had performed a few songs with at astronaut parties, with the idea of forming a four-piece group to play at this party.  The band was well-liked.  They decided to add a keyboard player, and their success continued, playing many weddings, and at hotels for events like Christmas Eve and New Year’s Eve.  They also performed live on Good Morning America.  In Gibson's last year with the group, Max Q was the warm-up band for Cheap Trick on their tour which came through Houston.

References
Moonlighting to the Max (Jill Michaels, Go [AirTran Airways inflight magazine], April 2005)
NASA's Space Shuttle: Cheers to 25 Years from a Veteran Space Reporter, Todd Halvorson, FLORIDA TODAY, 12 April 2006, accessed 5 April 2010
YouTube - Max Q performs at the Kemah Boardwalk in Kemah, TX. 4 September 2008

Musical groups from Houston
Musical groups established in 1987
1987 establishments in Texas
Astronauts